{{Infobox film
| name           = Thank God He Met Lizzie
| image          = Thank God He Met Lizzie - DVD cover.jpg
| image_size     =
| caption        = DVD cover
| director       = Cherie Nowlan
| producer       = Jonathan Shteinman
| writer         = Alexandra Long
| narrator       =
| starring       = Frances O'ConnorCate BlanchettRichard RoxburghCelia Ireland
| music          = Martin Armiger
| cinematography =
| editing        =
| distributor    =
| released       = 1997
| runtime        = 91 minutes
| country        = Australia
| language       = English
| budget         = A$2.25 million<ref>"Production Survey", Cinema Papers', February 1997 p62</ref>
| gross          = $565,747 (Australia)
}}Thank God He Met Lizzie is a 1997 Australian romantic comedy film directed by Cherie Nowlan and starring Frances O'Connor, Richard Roxburgh and Cate Blanchett. It was Nowlan's directorial debut.  In the United States, the film was released as The Wedding Party.Premise
The film revolves around two stories, firstly the upcoming wedding of Lizzie (Blanchett) and Guy (Roxburgh) and a second story in flashback of Guy's previous relationship with Jenny (Frances O'Connor).

Cast
 Richard Roxburgh as Guy Jamieson Cate Blanchett as Lizzie Frances O'Connor as Jenny Linden Wilkinson as Poppy John Gaden as Dr. O'Hara Genevieve Mooy as Mrs. Jamieson Michael Ross as Mr. Jamieson Melissa Ippolito as Catriona younger Elena Pavli as Catriona older Craig Rasmus as Dominic Rhett Walton as Tony Jeanette Cronin as Yvette Arthur Angel as George Wadih Dona as Angelo Celia Ireland as Cheryl Roy Billing as Ron

Music

Composer:  Martin Armiger
Orchestrator:  Derek Williams
Conductor:  Martin Armiger
Music mixer:  Michael StavrouMike Stavrou.  (Sydney, Australia)

Production
Cherie Nowlan had met Alexandra Long at the Australian Film Television Radio School and they had collaborated on two short films, including Lucinda 31. They decided to make a feature together.

Box officeThank God He Met Lizzie'' grossed $565,747 at the box office in Australia.

See also
Cinema of Australia

References

External links

Thank God He Met Lizzie at the National Film and Sound Archive

1997 films
1997 romantic comedy films
Australian romantic comedy films
Films set in Sydney
1997 directorial debut films
Films directed by Cherie Nowlan
1990s English-language films
1990s Australian films